José Luis Silva Araya (born January 7, 1991) is a Chilean footballer, who plays as midfielder for Lautaro de Buin in the Segunda División Profesional de Chile.

Career
He began his career in the youth system of Universidad de Chile before making his debut in the 2008 Clausura tournament against Cobresal. In 2009 Apertura tournament he played his second match with Universidad de Chile, scoring a goal against Cobresal. For the 2011 Clausura tournament he played on loan at Everton. For 2012 he was loaned again, this time at Rangers.

Honours

Club
Universidad de Chile
Primera División de Chile (1): 2009 Apertura

External links
 BDFA profile
 

1991 births
Living people
Footballers from Santiago
Chilean footballers
Chile under-20 international footballers
Chilean expatriate footballers
Universidad de Chile footballers
Everton de Viña del Mar footballers
Rangers de Talca footballers
O'Higgins F.C. footballers
Kallithea F.C. players
Deportes Magallanes footballers
Magallanes footballers
Deportes Iquique footballers
curicó Unido footballers
Cobreloa footballers
Deportes La Serena footballers
Puerto Montt footballers
Lautaro de Buin footballers
Chilean Primera División players
Primera B de Chile players
Segunda División Profesional de Chile players
Football League (Greece) players
Expatriate footballers in Greece
Chilean expatriate sportspeople in Greece
Association football midfielders